Jack Ryan (September 19, 1884 – October 16, 1949) was a pitcher in Major League Baseball between 1908 and 1911.

Ryan was involved in a trade on February 16, 1909, in which he, Charlie Chech, and $12,500 went from the Cleveland Naps to the Boston Red Sox in exchange for future Hall of Fame pitcher Cy Young.  After his playing career, Ryan was a pitching coach for the Red Sox from 1923 to 1927.

References

External links

 

 

1884 births
1949 deaths
Major League Baseball pitchers
Brooklyn Dodgers players
Cleveland Naps players
Boston Red Sox players
Boston Red Sox coaches
Minor league baseball managers
Mt. Clemens Bathers players
Jackson Senators players
Gulfport Crabs players
New Orleans Pelicans (baseball) players
St. Paul Saints (AA) players
Jersey City Skeeters players
Mobile Sea Gulls players
Omaha Rourkes players
Los Angeles Angels (minor league) players
Omaha Buffaloes players
Albany Nuts players
People from Lawrenceville, Illinois
Baseball players from Illinois